Denis Stinat (born 18 July 1983 in Chartres) is a retired French association footballer, who played as a left-back and current assistant manager of Bergerac Périgord.

Career

Coaching career
In the beginning of 2018, Stinat was appointed manager of Bayonne's reserve team, which was playing in the Regional 1. In the 2019-20 season, he was promoted to assistant coach of the first team.

In the summer 2020, he was appointed assistant manager of Stade Poitevin. Stinat left the club, alongside manager Erwan Lannuzel, at the end of the 2020-21 season. Ahead of the 2021-22 season, the duo joined Bergerac Périgord.

References

External links

1983 births
Living people
Sportspeople from Chartres
French footballers
Association football defenders
FC Nantes players
Dijon FCO players
Stade Brestois 29 players
Les Herbiers VF players
FC Martigues players
FC Gueugnon players
Aviron Bayonnais FC players
Ligue 1 players
Ligue 2 players
Championnat National players
Footballers from Centre-Val de Loire